Oriental music may refer to:

Egyptian Folklore music 
Mizrahi music
Music of Asia
Ravanahatha
Music of Sri Lanka
Turkish music (style)

sv:Orientalisk musik